Lakshan Edirisinghe (born 31 January 1993) is a Sri Lankan cricketer. He made his first-class debut for Sri Lanka Army Sports Club in the 2012–13 Premier Trophy on 15 February 2013.

References

External links
 

1993 births
Living people
Sri Lankan cricketers
Sri Lanka Army Sports Club cricketers
People from Anuradhapura